James Cecil Henshall (26 November 1906 – 1969) was an English footballer who played in the Football League for Port Vale and Crewe Alexandra.

Career
Henshall joined Port Vale in May 1928 and made his debut on 20 December 1930, in a 3–2 win over Millwall at The Old Recreation Ground. After being a regular for the remainder of the season, scoring twice in 18 Second Division games, he fell out of favour. He scored four goals in 16 games in 1931–32, including one in a 9–3 defeat to Tottenham Hotspur at White Hart Lane. He featured just five times in 1932–33, and was transferred to Crewe Alexandra in January 1933. He later moved on to Stockport County, also in the Third Division North. Henshall managed 19 league appearances for Alexandra but was not picked for County before his departure to non-league football. He played for Shelbourne in Ireland, before joining Mossley where in four seasons he appeared 174 times, scoring 56 goals. He later turned out for Ashton National Gas and Dinnington Athletic.

Career statistics
Source:

References

1906 births
1969 deaths
Footballers from Stoke-on-Trent
English footballers
Association football midfielders
Port Vale F.C. players
Crewe Alexandra F.C. players
Stockport County F.C. players
English expatriate footballers
Expatriate association footballers in the Republic of Ireland
Shelbourne F.C. players
Mossley A.F.C. players
Ashton National F.C. players
Dinnington Athletic F.C. players
English Football League players
League of Ireland players